The triboelectric effect (also known as triboelectric charging) is a type of contact electrification on which certain materials become electrically charged after they are separated from a different material with which they were in contact. Rubbing the two materials with each other increases the contact between their surfaces, and hence the triboelectric effect. Rubbing glass with fur for example, or a plastic comb through the hair, can build up triboelectricity. Most everyday static electricity is triboelectric. The polarity and strength of the charges produced differ according to the materials, surface roughness, temperature, strain, and other properties.

The triboelectric effect is very unpredictable, and only broad generalizations can be made. Amber, for example, can acquire an electric charge by contact and separation (or friction) with a material like wool. This property was first recorded by Thales of Miletus. The word "electricity" is derived from William Gilbert's initial coinage, "electra", which originates in the Greek word for amber, . The prefix  (Greek for ‘rub’) refers to ‘friction’, as in tribology. Other examples of materials that can acquire a significant charge when rubbed together include glass rubbed with silk, and hard rubber rubbed with fur.

A very familiar example could be the rubbing of a plastic pen on a sleeve of almost any typical material like cotton, wool, polyester, or blended fabric used in modern clothing. Such an electrified pen will attract and pick up pieces of paper less than a square centimeter when the pen approaches. Also, such a pen will repel a similarly electrified pen. This repulsion is readily detectable in the sensitive setup of hanging both pens on threads and setting them nearby one another. Such experiments lead to the theory of two types of quantifiable electric charge, one being effectively the negative of the other, with a simple sum respecting signs giving the total charge. The electrostatic attraction of the charged plastic pen to neutral uncharged pieces of paper (for example) is due to temporary charge separation (electric polarisation or dipole moment) of electric charges within the paper (or perhaps alignments of permanent molecular or atomic electric dipoles). A net force then arises as the slightly nearer charges of the dipole get attracted more strongly in the nonuniform field from the pen which diminishes with distance. In a uniform electric field, for example inside parallel capacitor plates, temporary polarisation would occur in the small pieces of paper but with zero net attraction.

The triboelectric effect is now considered to be related to the phenomenon of adhesion, where two materials composed of different molecules tend to stick together because of attraction between the different molecules.  While adhesion is not a chemical bond between atoms, there is an exchange of electrons between the different types of molecules, resulting in an electrostatic attraction between the molecules that holds them together. Physical separation of materials that are adhered together results in friction between the materials. Because the electron transfer between molecules in the different materials is not immediately reversible, the excess electrons in one type of molecule remain left behind, while a deficit of electrons occurs in the other. Thus, a material can develop a positive or negative charge (see also static electricity) that dissipates after the materials separate.

The mechanisms of triboelectrification (or contact-electrification) have been debated for many years, with possible mechanisms including electron transfer, ion transfer or the material's species transfer. Recent studies in 2018 using Kelvin probe microscopy and triboelectric nanogenerators revealed that electron transfer is the dominant mechanism for triboelectrification between solid and solid. The work function model can be used to explain electron transfer between a metal and a dielectric. The surface states model can be used to explain electron transfer between two dielectrics. For a general case, since triboelectrification occurs for any material, a generic model has been proposed by Wang, in which the electron transfer is caused by a strong electron cloud overlap between two atoms for the lowered interatomic potential barrier by shortening the bonding length. Based on the model, the effects of temperature and photo excitation on the triboelectrification were investigated. Such model can be further extended to the cases of liquid-solid, liquid-liquid and even gas-liquid.

Triboelectric series  

A triboelectric series is a list of materials, ordered by certain relevant properties, such as how quickly a material develops a charge relative to other materials on the list. Johan Carl Wilcke published the first one in a 1757 paper on static charges. Materials are often listed in order of the polarity of charge separation when they are touched with another object. A material towards the bottom of the series, when touched to a material near the top of the series, will acquire a more negative charge. The farther away two materials are from each other on the series, the greater the charge transferred. Materials near to each other on the series may not exchange any charge, or may even exchange the opposite of what is implied by the list. This can be caused by rubbing, by contaminants or oxides, or other variables. The series was further expanded by Shaw and Henniker by including natural and synthetic polymers, and showed the alteration in the sequence depending on surface and environmental conditions. Lists vary somewhat as to the exact order of some materials, since the relative charge varies for nearby materials. From actual tests, there is little or no measurable difference in charge affinity between metals, probably because the rapid motion of conduction electrons cancels such differences.

Another triboelectric series based on measuring the triboelectric charge density of materials was quantitatively standardized by Prof. Zhong Lin Wang's group.  The triboelectric charge density of the tested materials was measured with respect to liquid mercury in a glove box under well-defined conditions, with fixed temperature, pressure and humidity to achieve reliable values. The proposed method standardizes the experimental set up for uniformly quantifying the surface triboelectrification of general materials.

Cause
Although the part 'tribo-' comes from the Greek for "rubbing", τρίβω (τριβή: friction), the two materials only need to come into contact for electrons to be exchanged.  After coming into contact, mobile charges move from one material to the other to equalize their electrochemical potential.  This is what creates the net charge difference between the objects. When both contacting materials are dielectrics, the moving charge is not carried by electron, but rather by an ion, such as H+. In effect, this process is similar to an acid-base reaction, when the base object becomes positively charged,  and the acid object becomes negatively charged. In addition, some materials may exchange ions of differing mobility, or exchange charged fragments of larger molecules.

The triboelectric effect is related to friction only because they both involve adhesion.  However, the effect is greatly enhanced by rubbing the materials together, as they touch and separate many times.

For surfaces with differing geometry, rubbing may also lead to heating of protrusions, causing pyroelectric charge separation which may add to the existing contact electrification, or which may oppose the existing polarity.  Surface nano-effects are not well understood, and the atomic force microscope has enabled rapid progress in this field of physics.

Sparks
Because the surface of the material is now electrically charged, either negatively or positively, any contact with an uncharged conductive object or with an object having substantially different charge may cause an electrical discharge of the built-up static electricity: a spark.  A person simply walking across a carpet, removing a nylon shirt or rubbing against a car seat can also create a potential difference of many thousands of volts, which is enough to cause a spark one millimeter long or more.

Electrostatic discharge may not be evident in humid conditions because surface condensation normally prevents triboelectric charging.

Electrostatic discharges (other than lightning which comes from triboelectric charging of ice and water droplets within clouds) cause minimal harm because the energy (V2C) of the spark is very small; however, such sparks can ignite flammable vapors (see risks and counter-measures). This is not the case when the capacitance of one of the objects is very large.

Mechanism of triboelectrification

Interatomic interaction potential can be applied to understand the interactions between atoms. When two atoms are at equilibrium positions, with an equilibrium interatomic distance, the electron clouds or wave functions are overlapped partially. On one hand, if the two atoms get close to each other as pressed by an external force, the interatomic distance becomes shorter than the equilibrium distance, the two atoms thus repel each other because of the increase in electron cloud overlap. It is in this region that electron transfer occurs. On the other hand, if the two atoms are separated from each other such that they have a larger interatomic distance than the equilibrium distance, they will attract with each other due to long-range Van der Waals interaction.

An atomic-scale charge transfer mechanism (generic electron-cloud-potential model) was proposed for the triboelectrification. First, before the atomic-scale contact of two materials, there is no overlap between their electron clouds, and an attractive force exists. The electrons are so tightly bound in specific orbits so that they cannot escape freely. Then, when the two atoms in two materials get close to contact, an ionic or covalent bond is formed between them by the electron cloud overlap. An external force can further decrease the interatomic distance (bond length), and the strong electron cloud overlap induces the drop of the energy barrier between the two, resulting in electron transfer, which is the triboelectrification process. Once the two atoms are separated, the transferred electrons would remain because an energy is needed for the electrons to transfer back, forming the electrostatic charges on surfaces of the materials.

In aircraft and spacecraft
Aircraft develop a static charge through collisions with droplets and ice particles. The static can be discharged with static dischargers or static wicks.

NASA follows a "triboelectrification rule" whereby they will cancel a launch if the launch vehicle is predicted to pass through certain types of clouds.  Flying through high-level clouds can generate "P-static" (P for precipitation), which can create static around the launch vehicle that will interfere with radio signals sent by or to the vehicle. This may inhibit telemetry to the ground or the vehicle, particularly critical signals for the flight termination system. When a hold is put in place due to the triboelectrification rule, it remains until Space Wing and observer personnel, such as those in reconnaissance aircraft, indicate that the skies are clear.

Risks and counter-measures

Ignition
The effect is of considerable industrial importance in terms of both safety and potential damage to manufactured goods. Static discharge is a particular hazard in grain elevators owing to the danger of a dust explosion. The spark produced is fully able to ignite flammable vapours, for example, petrol, ether  fumes as well as methane gas. For bulk fuel deliveries and aircraft fueling a grounding connection is made between the vehicle and the receiving tank prior to opening the tanks. When fueling vehicles at a retail station touching metal on the car before opening the gas tank or touching the nozzle may decrease one's risk of static ignition of fuel vapors.

In the workplace
Means have to be provided to discharge static from carts which may carry volatile liquids, flammable gases, or oxygen in hospitals. Even where only a small charge is produced, it can result in dust particles being attracted to the rubbed surface. In the case of textile manufacture this can lead to a permanent grimy mark where the cloth comes in contact with dust accumulations held by a static charge. Dust attraction may be reduced by treating insulating surfaces with an antistatic cleaning agent.

Damage to electronics
Some electronic devices, most notably CMOS integrated circuits and MOSFETs (a type of transistor), can be accidentally destroyed by high-voltage static discharge.  Such components are usually stored in a conductive foam for protection. Grounding oneself by touching the workbench, or using a special bracelet or anklet is standard practice while handling unconnected integrated circuits. Another way of dissipating charge is by using conducting materials such as carbon black loaded rubber mats in operating theatres, for example.

Devices containing sensitive components must be protected during normal use, installation, and disconnection, accomplished by designed-in protection at external connections where needed. Protection may be through the use of more robust devices or protective countermeasures at the device's external interfaces. These may be opto-isolators, less sensitive types of transistors, and static bypass devices such as metal oxide varistors.

Source of noise 
Within medical cable assemblies and lead wires, random triboelectric noise is generated when the various conductors, insulation, and fillers rub against each other as the cable is flexed during movement. Noise generated within a cable is often called handling noise or cable noise, but this type of unwanted signal is more accurately described as triboelectric noise. When measuring low-level signals, noise in cable or wire may be problematic.  For example, the noise in an ECG or another medical signal may make accurate diagnosis difficult or even impossible. Keeping triboelectric noise at acceptable levels requires careful material selection, design, and processing as cable material is manufactured.

See also 

 Antistatic agent
 Contact electrification
 Electret
 Electrical phenomena
 Electronegativity
 Electrophorus
 ESD materials
 Nanogenerator
 Static electricity
 Triboluminescence
 Van de Graaff generator
 Wimshurst machine
 Xerography

References

Further reading

External links 
The TriboElectric Series  (great detail)
 Video: Detailed explanation by professional physicists
 Charged Rod Demonstration, University of Minnesota
 NASA, Science Crackling Planets
 A plastic comb rubbed with a cotton cloth attracts small pieces of paper (video)
 BBC News Article, 2005 - Man's static jacket sparks alert
 Triboelectric Generation: Getting Charged

Electrical phenomena
Electrostatics
Electricity
Tribology